Simarpreet Kaur Chahal is an Indian actress from Ambala who predominantly works in Punjabi films.

Career 
Chahal first stepped into the entertainment industry in 2014 where she appeared in some Punjabi music videos. After being discovered by talent scouts, she then went on to make her Punjabi film debut with the 2016 film Bambukat directed by Pankaj Batra and starred alongside Ammy Virk which was a success. Her next venture was with Priyanka Chopra where she starred in a film that she produced under her production banner Purple Pebble Pictures  called Sarvann alongside Amrinder Gill. Chahal won a Filmfare Award (Punjabi) for Best Debut Actress in 2017 for her role in Bambukat, and, in 2018, won the Best Actress Critics Award at the PTC Punjabi Film Awards.

Filmography

Television 
Chahal appeared on The Kapil Sharma Show with Priyanka Chopra and Ranjit Bawa to promote Sarvann (Episode 71/ 1 January 2017).

Awards and nominations 
PTC Punjabi Film Awards 2017 - Best Debut Actress Award (Won)
Filmfare 2017 Best Debut Actress Award (Won)
PTC Punjabi Film Awards 2018 - Best Actress Critics Award (Won)

References

External links

Living people
Indian film actresses
Actresses in Punjabi cinema
21st-century Indian actresses
Actresses from Punjab, India
Year of birth missing (living people)